The Basséra is a short mountain river that flows through the Alpes-Maritimes department of southeastern France. Its source is in the Maritime Alps, and it flows into the river Bévéra, itself a tributary of the Roya, near Sospel.

References

Rivers of France
Rivers of Alpes-Maritimes
Rivers of Provence-Alpes-Côte d'Azur